Estola misella is a species of beetle in the family Cerambycidae. It was described by Bates in 1885. It is known from Guatemala, Honduras, and Panama.

References

Estola
Beetles described in 1885